Mallobathra campbellica is a moth of the family Psychidae. This species is endemic to New Zealand and is found only on Campbell Island.

Taxonomy
This species was first described by John Stewart Dugdale in 1971. The female holotype specimen was collected by Guillermo Kuschel in January at Beeman Camp on Campbell Island and is held at the New Zealand Arthropod Collection.

Description 
Dugdale described the larvae of this species as follows:

Dugdale described the adult female of this species as follows:

Distribution 

This species is endemic to New Zealand and is found only on Campbell Island.

Behaviour 
The adults are on the wing in December and January.

Habitat 
The adults of this species inhabit sheltered clearings amongst scrub where as the larvae inhabit leaf litter.

References 

Moths described in 1971
Moths of New Zealand
Psychidae
Endemic fauna of New Zealand
Endemic moths of New Zealand